Tenors is an album by David Murray released on the Japanese DIW label in 1988. It features six quartet performances by Murray with Fred Hopkins, Dave Burrell and Ralph Peterson Jr. As the title indicates, the album features songs written by or associated with tenor saxophonists.

Reception
The AllMusic review by Al Campbell awarded the album 3 stars stating "As with most of Murray's recordings for DIW, Tenors is worth picking up despite the inflated import price tag."

Track listing
 "Equinox" (John Coltrane)6:17
 "Ghosts" (Albert Ayler)6:40
 "Over Time" (Burrell)10:28
 "Perfection" (Ornette Coleman)5:40
 "Chelsea Bridge" (Billy Strayhorn)9:05
 "St. Thomas" (Sonny Rollins)9:33

Personnel
David Murraytenor saxophone
Dave Burrellpiano
Fred Hopkinsbass
Ralph Peterson Jr.drums

References 

1988 albums
David Murray (saxophonist) albums
DIW Records albums